Tovomita is a genus of flowering plants in the family Clusiaceae. They are noted for having white-yellow latex and containing xanthones. The genus is distributed in the tropical Americas, with many occurring in Venezuela. Most are native to the forests of the Amazon.

Most Tovomita species are trees, and a few are shrubs. They sometimes have buttress roots. There are monoecious and dioecious species.

The taxonomy of this genus and its relatives is a current topic of research. Phylogenetic analyses have helped to clarify relationships between the species, and many new species have been named and described in recent years. The genus Tovomita is not monophyletic.

Some species are considered to be threatened, but the conservation status for most Tovomita species is not known due to lack of data. The most significant threat to the species is the deforestation of the Amazon.

As of 2019 there are about 50 species.

Species include:
Tovomita aequatoriensis
Tovomita brasiliensis
Tovomita brevistaminea
Tovomita chachapoyasensis
Tovomita croatii
Tovomita longifolia
Tovomita macrophylla
Tovomita mangle
Tovomita microcarpa
Tovomita rubella
Tovomita stylosa
Tovomita weberbaueri
Tovomita weddelliana

Taxonomy
Synonyms of this genus are:
Marialvaea Mart.
Tovomitidium Ducke

References

External links
Marinho, L. C. et al. Tovomita (Clusiaceae) of the Brazilian Atlantic Rainforest. Color photographic field guide to some Tovomita species. Field Museum.

 
Malpighiales genera
Neotropical realm flora